Price White  ( – 1952) was a Welsh international footballer. He was part of the Wales national football team, playing one match on 29 February 1896 against Ireland.

He lived in Bangor, North Wales and was employed as an engineer by the Bangor Electrical Company. On 12 August 1902 he married Charlotte Bell, the suffragist and local councillor. 

They had two children together, Margaret and David Archibald, who became a solicitor and Conservative Party politician.

See also
 List of Wales international footballers (alphabetical)

References

1873 births
1952 deaths
Welsh footballers
Wales international footballers
Place of birth missing
Association footballers not categorized by position